The 10th Separate Mountain Assault Brigade "Edelweiss" is a specialized unit of the Ukrainian Ground Forces, specifically trained for mountain warfare operations. Based in Kolomyia and part of Operational Command West, the brigade has a history of defending their country in various conflicts, including the war in Donbas in 2016 and the Russian invasion of Ukraine in 2022. During these conflicts, the brigade, defended Marinka, Popasna, Mariupol and Bakhmut.

History 
The 10th Separate Mountain Assault Brigade was formed on October 1, 2015, in Kolomyia, as part of the Operational Command West. Its formation was driven by the need to protect Northern Bukovina from potential Romanian territorial claims and to prepare for any future conflict with Russia. The brigade was composed of experienced soldiers and volunteers, including the 24th Separate Assault Battalion and the former Aidar Battalion. Its first commander, Colonel Vasyl Zubanych, was a Hero of Ukraine and a former battalion commander in the 128th Mechanized Brigade. To attract new recruits, the brigade offered a 25% pay increase to volunteers who joined the brigade on a contract basis. The first group of recruits consisted of 1,000 volunteers. In January 2016, the Ukrainian Ministry of Defence reported that the brigade was ready to begin its combat training. The brigade was stationed at Bila Tserkva and later relocated to Kolomyia once new barracks were completed. In February 2016, the Ukrainian Ground Forces decided to form a new Bukovina mountain battalion in Chernivtsi, and the 8th Separate Motorized Infantry Battalion and the 46th Separate Special-Purpose Battalion "Donbas-Ukraine" were added to the brigade's roster. The 10th Separate Mountain Assault Brigade thus became a formidable unit, consisting of a few thousand soldiers. The Brigade played a crucial role in the war in Donbas, serving from May 25 to November 2016. The brigade was deployed to defend key areas around Marinka, Krasnohorivka, Taramchuk, Stepne, and Solodke, where it faced relentless attacks from separatist and Russian artillery, mortars, and tanks. Despite the challenges, the brigade held its ground, successfully defending against repeated assaults from enemy forces.

On August 24, 2016, the Independence Day of Ukraine, the brigade was presented with its battle flag by President Petro Poroshenko, recognizing their bravery and dedication in defending their country. During its tour in the Donbas war, the brigade lost 22 which were killed in action before the end of the deployment. After completing its tour in the Donbas, the brigade returned to Kolomyia in November. The 24th Assault and 46th Separate Special Purpose Battalions were withdrawn from the brigade due to the desire to station them closer to their homes, as 80% of their personnel were from western Ukraine. The  Brigade, underwent further reorganization after its first deployment to the war in Donbas from May to November 2016. In December 2016, the 109th and 108th Separate Mountain Assault Battalions were established to replace the previously withdrawn 24th Assault and 46th Separate Special Purpose Battalions. The brigade resumed its mountain training, including a climb to Veliky Verkh and to the summit of Hoverla, the tallest peak in Ukraine, to honor the Ukrainian casualties of the Battle of Debaltseve. In September 2017, the brigade was deployed again to the Donbas to defend positions around Popasna, with a soldier being killed in action on 23 September during fighting at Novooleksandrivka.

During the 2022 Russian invasion of Ukraine, the brigade is reported to have taken part in the defense of the country and engaged in battles around Mariupol in February 2022 and Bakhmut in December 2022.

Honorary title
On February 14, 2023, the brigade was granted the honorific "Edelweiss" by President Volodymyr Zelenskyy.

Structure 

As of 2023 the brigade's structure is as follows:
 10th Separate Mountain Assault Brigade, Kolomyia
 Brigade Headquarters and HQ Company
 8th Separate Mountain Battalion
 108th Separate Mountain Battalion
 109th Separate Mountain Battalion
 Tank Battalion
 Reconnaissance battalion
 Artillery Group
 Anti-Aircraft Company
 Support units

References 

Brigades of the Ukrainian Ground Forces
Military units and formations established in 2015
Mountain infantry brigades
Military units and formations of Ukraine in the war in Donbas
Military units and formations of the 2022 Russian invasion of Ukraine